Blissed Out may refer to:

 Blissed Out (The Beloved album), 1991
 Blissed Out (Dum Dum Girls album), 2010